The University of Michigan School of Public Health is one of the professional graduate schools of the University of Michigan. Located in Ann Arbor, Michigan,  UM SPH is one of the oldest schools of public health in the country and is also considered one of the top schools focusing on health in the United States. Founded in 1941, the School of Public Health grew out of the University of Michigan's degree programs in public health, some of which date back to the 19th century.

According to U.S. News & World Reports report on graduate programs, the University of Michigan School of Public Health was ranked as the #4 School of Public Health in the country and also had the #1 Healthcare Management program in the country in 2011.

Notable faculty 
 Thomas Francis Jr., mentor of Jonas Salk; ran field trials of oral polio vaccine that deemed it safe and effective
 John R. Griffith, Andrew Pattullo Collegiate Professor in the Department of Health Management and Policy; co-author of The Well-Managed Health Care Organization
 Rebecca Hasson, kinesiologist 
 Sharon Kardia is the Millicent W. Higgins Collegiate Professor of Epidemiology
 Neal Krause, health behavior and health education expert
 Jonas Salk, developer of the polio vaccine

Notable alumni 

 Larry Brilliant, physician, epidemiologist, technologist, author and the former director of Google's philanthropic arm Google.org
 Julio Frenk, former Minister of Health in Mexico; former dean of Harvard School of Public Health
 David Michael Green, MacArthur Foundation Fellow
 Albert H. Wheeler, first African-American Mayor of Ann Arbor, Michigan
 Mona Hanna-Attisha, pediatrician who was a key whistleblower revealing the Flint Water Crisis which exposed children to dangerous levels of lead in Flint, Michigan.

References

External links 
University of Michigan School of Public Health

Public Health
Medical and health organizations based in Michigan
Schools of public health in the United States
Educational institutions established in 1941
1941 establishments in Michigan
University of Michigan campus